Angélica Freitas (born April 8, 1973) is a Brazilian poet and translator.

Biography 
Freitas was born in Pelotas, Rio Grande do Sul, in  1973. She graduated in journalism at Universidade Federal do Rio Grande do Sul (UFRGS), living for some time in Porto Alegre. She moved later to São Paulo, working as repórter for the newspaper O Estado de S. Paulo and magazine Informática Hoje. She left Brazil in 2006, having lived temporarily in the Netherlands, Bolivia and Argentina. Freitas came back to her birthplace Pelotas, where she currently lives.

Literature 
Angélica Freitas had her poems published for the first time in an anthology of Brazilian poetry published in Argentina, titled Cuatro poetas recientes del Brasil (Buenos Aires: Black & Vermelho, 2006), organized and translated by Argentine poet Cristian De Nápoli. On that same year, she participated of public readings of her poems in São Paulo, at Casa das Rosas, and at the Buenos Aires Latin American Poetry Festival. Her first book of poems was Rilke Shake (São Paulo: Cosac Naify, 2007).

Freitas's poetry was published in France, Germany, Mexico, Spain and the United States. Her poems were published at several print and digital magazines like Inimigo Rumor (Rio de Janeiro, Brasil), Diário de Poesía (Buenos Aires/Rosário, Argentina), águas furtadas (Lisbon, Portugal), Hilda (Berlin, Germany) and Aufgabe (New York City, United States).

In 2012 her book um útero é do tamanho de um punho  was a finalist on 2013  Prêmio Portugal Telecom. The English edition of  Rilke Shake (translated by Hillary Kaplan) won the Best Translated Book Award for poetry in 2016.

Works

Poetry
 Rilke Shake (São Paulo: Cosac Naify, 2007)
 um útero é do tamanho de um punho (São Paulo: Cosac Naify, 2013)
 Canções de atormentar (São Paulo: Companhia das Letras, 2020)

As editor
 Modo de Usar & Co. magazine (Rio de Janeiro: Livraria Berinjela, 2007)
 Modo de Usar & Co. 2  magazine(Rio de Janeiro: Livraria Berinjela, 2009)

In anthology
 Ghost Fishing: An Eco-Justice Poetry Anthology (University of Georgia Press, 2018) - United States of America
 Otra línea de fuego: quince poetas brasileñas ultracontemporaneas. Org. Heloísa Buarque de Hollanda. (Diputación Provincial de Málaga, 2009) - Spain
 VERSSchmuggel / Contrabando de Versos (Berlin: Das Wunderhorn / São Paulo: Editora 34, 2009) - Germany
 El libro de los gatos (Buenos Aires: Bajo la Luna, 2009) - Argentina
 A Poesia Andando. 13 poetas do Brasil (Lisboa: Cotovia, 2008) - Portugal
 Skräp-poesi: antología bilingüe en español y sueco (Malmö: ed. POESIA con C, 2008) - Sweden
 Natiunea Poetilor (Suceava: ed. Musatini, 2008) - Romania
 Poesía-añicos y sonares híbridos. Doce poetas latinoamericanos (Berlin: SuKulTur, 2007) - Germany
 Caos Portátil (Ciudad de México: ed. El Billar de Lucrecia, 2007) - México
 Cuatro Poetas Recientes del Brasil (Buenos Aires: Black & Vermelho, 2006) - Argentina -  
 Poemas no ônibus (Porto Alegre: Secretaria Municipal da Cultura, 2002) - Brasil -

References

External links 
 Página pessoal da autora com poemas orais no Myspace
 Artigo sobre a poeta no jornal Folha de S. Paulo
 Ensaio da crítica norte-americana Hilary Kaplan sobre Rilke Shake

1973 births
20th-century Brazilian poets
Brazilian translators
Brazilian women poets
Living people
People from Pelotas
Federal University of Rio Grande do Sul alumni
20th-century Brazilian women writers